The Barr Smith Library is the main library of the University of Adelaide, situated in the centre of the North Terrace campus.

History
The library was named in honour of Robert Barr Smith who donated £9,000 to buy books. In 1920 his family gave an extra £11,000 in the form of an endowment and in 1928 his son, Tom Elder Barr Smith, gave £30,000 for the Barr Smith library building.

The Barr Smith Library was designed by Adelaide architects Woods, Bagot & Laybourne Smith and opened on 4 March 1932, with later additions to the main building being built from the 1950s onwards. The present entrance was constructed in 1984.

Description
The library houses Rare Books and Special Collections and University Archives and Recordkeeping. It is also home to large collections across many subject areas including Australian history, politics and literature, English literature, world wars, socialism and fascism, women and gender studies, utopian literature, and food studies. Specialist collections include the Music Collection, East Asian Collection, Yaitya Ngutupira and Recreational Reading. Level 2 of the library is home to the large and opulent Reading Room. The High Use Collection and study spaces on level 3 can be accessed 24/7.

Librarians
Notable librarians include:
 Helga Josephine Zinnbauer 1943–1974

Gallery

References

 .

External links

University of Adelaide
Academic libraries in Australia
Barr Smith family
Libraries in South Australia
South Australian Heritage Register
Libraries established in 1932
1932 establishments in Australia